A hybrid roller coaster is a category of roller coasters that is defined as having the track made out of steel, while the support structure is made from wood. Though less common, this can also be flipped around, with the track made of wood with a steel running plate, and a support structure that is made of steel. An example of this is The Voyage at Holiday World. The wooden frame-steel track design of roller coaster is mostly known to be utilized by Rocky Mountain Construction in their I-Box track design, and Arrow Dynamic's Mine Train style roller coasters.

This type of design has several benefits, such as making the ride feel smooth and like that of a steel roller coaster. Hybrid roller coasters can also have inversions, such as Steel Vengeance at Cedar Point. They also tend to be taller, faster, and have steeper drops than that of wooden coasters.

History 
The oldest operating hybrid roller coaster is Cyclone at Luna Park, opening in 1927, with the track being made from wood and the support structure being made of steel. Arrow Dynamics built many Mine Train style coasters such as Adventure Express at Kings Island in 1991, with the tracks being made of tubular steel, and the support structure being made of wood. Arrow Dynamics continued to build mine trains until 2002 when their last hybrid mine train was built. Most of the modern hybrid coasters being built today are made by Rocky Mountain Construction and The Gravity Group. Rocky Mountain Construction makes conversions of old wooden roller coasters to turn them into hybrids with steel track and wooden supports, such as New Texas Giant at Six Flags Over Texas. The Gravity Group designs coasters with wooden track but with a steel support structure, such as Hades 360 at Mount Olympus Theme Park.

Terminology 
The term "hybrid roller coaster" started to be used by the coaster community when New Texas Giant opened and Six Flags classified the roller coaster as wood. Six Flags in response of the confusion classified the roller coaster as a "hybrid", which has since been used to include many other Rocky Mountain Construction Coasters of the same style. Though usually coasters are still classified as either "steel" or "wood", based on what their track material is. The use of the phrase is controversial.

References

Further reading
Bennett, David (1998). Roller Coaster: Wooden and Steel Coasters, Twisters and Corkscrews.  Edison, New Jersey: Chartwell Books. 9. .

Coker, Robert (2002). Roller Coasters: A Thrill Seeker's Guide to the Ultimate Scream Machines.  New York: Metrobooks.  14.  .

Urbanowicz, Steven J. (2002). The Roller Coaster Lover's Companion; Kensington, New YorK: Citadel Press. .

Hybrid roller coasters